The Barbados Red Cross Society was founded in 1960 as part of the British Red Cross. The Parliament of Barbados passed the Barbados Red Cross Society Act in 1966, the same year that Barbados became a country independent of the United Kingdom.

See also
Barbados Independence Act 1966

External links
Barbados Red Cross Web Site
IFRC Barbados Red Cross Society Profile

Red Cross and Red Crescent national societies
Red Cross
Organizations established in 1960
1960 establishments in Barbados